Pyers is a surname. Notable people with the surname include:

Paul Pyers (1935–2016), Australian rugby league player
Robert Pyers (1847–1915), Australian politician